Peter Lough (born January 4, 1975 in Toronto, Ontario) is a former lacrosse player in the National Lacrosse League. In his eight-year NLL career, Lough played for the Montreal Express, Columbus Landsharks, Arizona Sting, and Toronto Rock.

Professional career
Lough was originally drafted in the National Lacrosse League by the now defunct Ontario Raiders, though he did not play for them.  For the 2002 season he was signed by the Montreal Express as a free agent.  The Express folded prior to the 2003 Season, and in the resulting dispersal draft, Lough was acquired by the Columbus Landsharks (later the Arizona Sting) in the 1st round (3rd overall).

In 2004, Lough was co-winner of the NLL Sportsmanship award, and has made All-Star Game appearances in 2005, 2006, 2007 and 2008.

After the 2007 season, Lough became an unrestricted free agent and signed a two-year contract with the Toronto Rock.

Lough has played with the Brooklin Redmen of the Ontario Lacrosse Association, the Peterborough Lakers (2006 Mann Cup Champions) and played in the 2004 Heritage Cup for Team Canada. In 2007 he represented Canada, in Halifax, at the World Indoor Lacrosse Championships.

Hockey career
In addition, Lough played four years of hockey for Brock University, one year with the Canadian National Team and the Rochester Americans of the American Hockey League.

Statistics

NLL
Reference:

Awards

References

External links

1975 births
Living people
Arizona Sting players
Brock Badgers ice hockey players
Canadian lacrosse players
National Lacrosse League All-Stars
National Lacrosse League major award winners
Sportspeople from Toronto
Toronto Rock players